The 1986 North Bedfordshire Borough Council election took place on 8 May 1986 to elect members of North Bedfordshire Borough Council in England. This was on the same day as  other local elections.

Summary

Election result

References

Bedford
Bedford Borough Council elections
1980s in Bedfordshire